Raphael Muli Kiilu (died 2006) was a Kenyan diplomat and former permanent representative of the country to the United Nations.

References

Year of birth missing
2006 deaths
Kenyan politicians
Kenyan diplomats
Permanent Representatives of Kenya to the United Nations